The 1953 Singapore Open, also known as the 1953 Singapore Badminton Championships, took place from 17 October – 30 December 1953 at the Clerical Union Hall in Balestier and the Singapore Badminton Hall in Geylang, Singapore. The ties were played over a few months with the first round ties being played on the 17th of October and the last (men's doubles final) was played on the 30th of December.

Venue
Clerical Union Hall
Singapore Badminton Hall

Final results

References 

Singapore Open (badminton)
1953 in badminton